Seducing Mr. Perfect (Mr. 로빈 꼬시기), alternatively known as Seducing Mr. Robin, is a South Korean film, released on December 7, 2006. It was written and directed by Kim Sang-woo and stars Uhm Jung-hwa as Min Joon and Daniel Henney as Robin Heiden.

Plot summary
Min-june (Uhm Jung-hwa) is a believer in true love and always very dedicated to her current boyfriend. However, men always break up with her - her latest boyfriend ends their relationship on his birthday. Distracted by the latest break-up, she bumps into a car and a man steps out of it - who turns out to be her new boss, Robin Heiden (Daniel Henney). Heiden has very clear ideas about a relationship and love: both are a game of power and Min-june seeks advice from him, as she doesn't want to get dumped again. However, when she starts to treat men like Heiden treats women, she realizes that she prefers her older behavior, even if that means that she gets dumped again; she doesn't see love as a game of power and never will. Heiden, who has to deal with his own heartbreak, as he loved a woman so much that she had to shoot him to get the message across that she wasn't interested in him, starts to soften at Min-june's attitude towards life. He eventually falls in love with her and both get into a real relationship and a happy ending of their own. Instead of trying to make her understand that love is a game of power, he learned from her that love is the purest language of hearts; no need of rehearsals, judgements, hidings at all.

One of the unique concepts of the movie is that Robin Heiden speaks only English because he finds Korean hard to speak, while Min-june speaks mostly in Korean. The two seem to understand each other perfectly without any outside translation, although in the film it is explained that Heiden understood Korean but has difficulty speaking it. This was a new style of dialogue for Korean films, and it is partially credited for the film's success.

Cast
 Uhm Jung-hwa as Min-june
 Daniel Henney  as Robin Heiden
 Baek Do-bin as Hong Dae-ri 
 Choi Jong-ryol 
 Holly Karrol Clark as Jennifer Cohen
 Kim Ki-hyeon as Min-june's father
 Lee Sung-min as Yang Sang-mu
 Su Mun as Jun-hyeong
 Oh Mi-yeon as	Min-june's mother
 Ok Ji-young as Yun-mi
 Park Hyeon-yeong as Seo-yeong

See also
List of Korean-language films

References

External links
 Official site

2006 films
2006 romantic comedy films
South Korean romantic comedy films
Lotte Entertainment films
2000s Korean-language films
English-language South Korean films
2000s English-language films
2006 multilingual films
South Korean multilingual films
2000s South Korean films